Gary Lippman (born August 8, 1963) is an American author, journalist, attorney, and film producer. Lippman's journalistic work has been published in The New York Times, The Paris Review, Vice, and more. He produced the film Vinyl in 2012, and his debut novel Set the Controls for the Heart of Sharon Tate was published by Rare Bird Books in 2019. In July 2022, Lippman released his second book "We Loved The World But Could Not Stay", a collection of microfiction.

Early life and education
Lippman received his B.A. in English literature from Rutgers University in 1986, his J.D. from the Northwestern University Pritzker School of Law in 1990 and has worked with New York's Innocence Project.

Writing career
Lippman's journalistic writing includes social commentary, book reviews, interviews, and profiles of prominent cultural figures such as Daniel Menaker, John Perry Barlow and Lou Reed. His friendship with author Harry Eugene Crews has also been celebrated in his pieces: a great boulder of a man in a bathrobe sunk into a brown recliner chair in a living room filled with books, photographs, and, on one wall, the framed quilted image of a typewriter. 

Lippman's play Paradox Lust ran off-off Broadway theatre in 2001. His novel Set the Controls for the Heart of Sharon Tate won praise from the Sopranos actor Michael Imperioli.

Writings

Journalism
"Pynchonicity," The Paris Review, September 5, 2013.

"Even A Bouncer Can Cry," The New York Times City Room Blog, April 20, 2014.

"An Elderly Litterbug," The New York Times City Room Blog, January 22, 2015.

"Searching for Sharon Tate," Literary Hub, Crime Reads, August 9, 2019.

Feature Profiles
"A Singular Gentleman Goes Out Biting," The Paris Review, April 25, 2012.

"Living, Learning, and Going Long with Gypsy Boots, America’s First Hippie," Vice, March 13, 2013.

"Beyond the Call: A Memory of Lou Reed," Vice, November 8, 2013.

"That’s Material: An Interview with Daniel Menaker," The Paris Review, January 21, 2014.

"Amusing Myself: An Interview with Bob Neuwirth," The Paris Review, October 6, 2014.

"Remembering My Day with Lemmy Kilmister," Vice, December 21, 2015.

"Life and Acting: Catching Up with Jack Garfein," The Paris Review, February 9, 2016.

"Evil, ‘Venerable,’ and Otherwise: An Interview with Barbet Schroeder," The Paris Review, November 2, 2017.

"A Space Cowboy’s Curriculum," The Paris Review, June 21, 2018.

"Entering Freak City: Hanging Out with Harry Crews," Please Kill Me, October 21, 2019.

Fiction
Set the Controls for the Heart of Sharon Tate, Rare Bird Books, 2019.

We Loved The World But Could Not Stay, Rare Bird Books, 2022

References

1963 births
Living people